Shamo may refer to:

People
Shamo Abbey (born 1980), Ghanaian football forward
Shamo Quaye (1971–1997), Ghanaian football player 
 Ihor Shamo, (1925–1982), Ukrainian composer

Other
 Shāmò, a generic Chinese term for deserts.
 Shamo (chicken), a breed of chicken of Japan which was originated in Thailand
 Shamo (manga), a Japanese action manga
 Shamo (film), a 2007 Cantonese-language action film from Hong Kong which adapts the manga
Shamo Dam in Iran